The Talladega Indians (also known as the Tigers and Highlanders) were a Minor League Baseball team based in Talladega, Alabama, that played in the Georgia–Alabama League from 1913 to 1917 and 1928–1930. The team originated in Huntsville, Alabama where they were known as the Westerns and Mountaineers before moving midway through the 1912 season.

External links
Baseball Reference Talladega
Baseball Reference Huntsville

Talladega County, Alabama
Baseball teams established in 1911
Sports clubs disestablished in 1930
1911 establishments in Alabama
1930 disestablishments in Alabama
Professional baseball teams in Alabama
Defunct Georgia-Alabama League teams
Defunct Southeastern League teams
Defunct baseball teams in Alabama
Baseball teams disestablished in 1930